National Basketball League (Indonesia)
Rookie Player